Manitou is an unincorporated urban community in the Municipality of Pembina within the Canadian province of Manitoba that held town status prior to January 1, 2015. The Boundary Trail Railway is based in Manitou. The community's motto is "More Than A Small Town". The community is adjacent to PTH 3 and PR 244. 
Manitou is surrounded by Mennonite communities and is right next to the St. Leon Wind Farm, the largest wind farm in Manitoba and one of the largest in Canada.

Demographics 

Media 
Manitou has a weekly newspaper, the Western Canadian.

Arts and culture
Built in 1930, in the Arts and Crafts movement style, the Manitou Opera House is a local heritage landmark known for its unique acoustics. In 2007, Winnipeg folk musician Christine Fellows recorded parts of her album Nevertheless in the Manitou Opera House. It is booked for over 200 events per year.

Two historic houses associated with writer and activist Nellie McClung were renovated and relocated to the town in 2017 and reopened as museums.

Notable people
Thelma Forbes, politician
Robert Ironside, businessman
Nellie McClung, writer

References

External links
 

2015 disestablishments in Manitoba
Populated places disestablished in 2015
Designated places in Manitoba
Former towns in Manitoba
Hudson's Bay Company trading posts
Pembina Valley Region